Paul Rose is the name of:

Paul Lawrence Rose (1944–2014), American professor of European history and Jewish studies
Paul Rose (writer) (born 1971), British video games journalist and screenwriter
Paul Rose, electronic music producer more commonly known as Scuba
Paul Rose (political figure) (1943–2013), Front de Liberation du Quebec member who was convicted of the murder of Pierre Laporte
Paul Rose (rugby league), rugby league footballer
Paul Rose (TV presenter) (born 1951), TV presenter and explorer
Paul Rose (British politician) (1935–2015), British Labour MP
Paul Howard Rose (1880–1955), founder of Roses Stores
 Biff Rose (Paul Rose, born 1937), American comedian and singer-songwriter
Paul Rose (American politician), member of the Tennessee Senate